East European Politics and Societies is a peer-reviewed academic journal that covers the field of political science, especially concerning international relations of Eastern Europe. The journal's editors-in-chief are Wendy Bracewell (University College London) and Krzysztof Jasiewicz (Washington and Lee University). It was established in 1986 and is currently published by SAGE Publications in association with the American Council of Learned Societies and the American Association for the Advancement of Slavic Studies.

Abstracting and indexing 
East European Politics and Societies is abstracted and indexed in Scopus and the Social Sciences Citation Index. According to the Journal Citation Reports, its 2017 impact factor is 0.817, ranking it 117 out of 169 journals in the category "Political Science" and 25 out of 68 journals in the category "Area Studies."

References

External links 
 

SAGE Publishing academic journals
English-language journals
International relations journals
European studies journals
Quarterly journals
Publications established in 1986